Romain Jouan (born 16 July 1985) is a French professional tennis player.

Career

2008
On September 29, Jouan qualified for the first ATP tournament of his career in Metz after beating Fabio Fognini, Prakash Amritraj  and Tobias Kamke. Ranked #440, he defeated #51 Agustín Calleri 5–7, 6–1, 6–2 in the first round of the main draw, but lost to fourth-seeded Paul-Henri Mathieu 6–4, 6–4 in the second.

2009
His ranking not allowing him to enter even the qualifications, it looked like Jouan would not participate in Roland Garros that year; but when wild-card John Isner withdrew, the qualifications had already started, so his wild-card went to Jouan. He was drawn against World No. 6 Andy Roddick in the first round, who defeated him 6–2, 6–4, 6–2 without facing a single break point.

2010
In October, Jouan qualified for the first edition of the Open Sud de France in Montpellier by defeating Josselin Ouanna, Andrea Agazzi and Vincent Millot. For his first ATP Tour-level tournament of the year, he was drawn against American Taylor Dent. Despite winning the first set on a tie-break, he fell 6–7, 6–3, 6–4.

2011
In August, Jouan qualified for the second Grand Slam event of his career at the US Open, after defeating Denis Matsukevich 6–2, 6–4, Mitchell Frank 6–3, 4–6, 6–3 and Denis Kudla 6–4, 6–2 in the three rounds of qualifying.

Challengers and Futures finals

Singles: 7 (4–3)

Doubles: 13 (3–10)

References

External links
 
 
 Jouan Recent Match Results
 Jouan World Ranking History

1985 births
Living people
French male tennis players
Sportspeople from Bordeaux
People from Landerneau
Sportspeople from Finistère
Tennis players from Bordeaux